Peter Pan Bus Lines operates an intercity bus service in the Northeastern United States. It is headquartered in Springfield, Massachusetts.

It operates service to/from to Connecticut, the District of Columbia, Massachusetts, Maryland, New Hampshire, New Jersey, New York, Pennsylvania, and Rhode Island. 

Since its founding in 1933, the company has been owned by the Picknelly family.

The company logo is based on an illustration by Roy Best for the Peter Pan Picture Book.

Peter Pan's fleet consists mostly of buses manufactured by Motor Coach Industries.

History 
Peter Carmine Picknelly founded the company in 1933 with two Buick limousines and named it after his son's favorite storybook, Peter Pan. The company's first route operated between Northampton, Massachusetts and Boston through Stafford Springs, Connecticut, costing $1.75 and requiring nearly four hours of travel time. In 1957, the Massachusetts Turnpike was opened and travel time was cut in half.

The son of the founder, Peter L. Picknelly, took over upon the death of the founder in 1964 and developed tour packages to the 1964 New York World's Fair.

Peter Pan Bus Lines was affiliated with Trailways Transportation System beginning in the 1990s, but ended that affiliation in 2005.

In 1999, an alliance was formed with Greyhound Lines, coordinating schedules, marketing, and ticket sales. Peter Pan and Greyhound had been bitter rivals for most of the 1990s, when Peter Pan expanded outside New England to serve New York City, Washington, D. C., Philadelphia and Baltimore. This partnership was dissolved in 2017.

In December 2002, Peter Pan acquired Coach USA's Northeastern division with 255 vehicles. In 2004, Peter Pan sold the Maine Line operation in Portland to Cyr Bus Line. In 2005, Peter Pan closed its Pawtuxet Valley, Rhode Island operations.

In 2004, Peter A. Picknelly III took over as CEO after the death of his father.

Controversies
CEO Peter A. Picknelly III has made political contributions aimed at dissuading the development of high-speed railroads in Massachusetts.

References

Further reading

External links
 
 Peter Pan Bus Lines Inc. Company Snapshot at the Federal Motor Carrier Safety Administration

1933 establishments in Massachusetts
American companies established in 1933
Bus companies of the United States
Companies based in Springfield, Massachusetts
Economy of the Northeastern United States
Intercity bus companies of the United States
Transportation companies based in Massachusetts
Transport companies established in 1933
Yellow Cab Company